Dalcio Víctor Giovagnoli (born 5 June 1963) is an Argentine football manager and former player who played as a centre back. He is the current manager of Chilean club Rangers de Talca.

Honours

Club
Jorge Wilstermann
 Primera División de Bolivia (1): 1998 Apertura, Runner–up 1998 Clausura

Oriente Petrolero
 Primera División de Bolivia (1): 2001

San Martín de San Juan
 Primera B Nacional (1): Runner–up 2003 Apertura

C.A.I.
 Primera B Nacional (1): Runner–up 2006 Clausura

Cobresal
 Primera División de Chile (1): 2015 Clausura

References

External links
 Dalcio Giovagnoli at Football-Lineups
 
 

1963 births
Living people
Footballers from Rosario, Santa Fe
Argentine footballers
Association football defenders
Newell's Old Boys footballers
Instituto footballers
Nueva Chicago footballers
Central Córdoba de Rosario footballers
Argentine football managers
Central Córdoba de Rosario managers
San Martín de San Juan managers
Comisión de Actividades Infantiles managers
Aldosivi managers
Tiro Federal managers
Chacarita Juniors managers
Club Atlético Belgrano managers
Ferro Carril Oeste managers
C.D. Jorge Wilstermann managers
Oriente Petrolero managers
Bolivia national football team managers
Argentine expatriate sportspeople in Ecuador
C.D. Cuenca managers
Argentine expatriate sportspeople in Paraguay
Argentine expatriate sportspeople in Chile
Expatriate football managers in Chile
Expatriate football managers in Bolivia
Expatriate football managers in Ecuador
Expatriate football managers in Paraguay
Rangers de Talca managers
Cobresal managers
O'Higgins F.C. managers
Argentine expatriate sportspeople in Bolivia
Club Sol de América managers